Steven James Thompson (born 2 November 1964) is an English retired professional footballer who played as a midfielder. He is the Head of Recruitment for Vanarama National League side Oldham Athletic.

Playing career
Thompson started his playing career as an apprentice at Bolton Wanderers before signing his first contract in 1982, and was at the club until 1991 playing in a total of 410 games, and scoring 57 goals in all competitions. He played on the winning side at Wembley in 1989 in the Football League Trophy final. On 13 August 1991, he signed for Luton Town for £180,000. However, his stay with the Hatters was short-lived, he made just five league appearances before moving to Leicester City two months later on 22 October where he played in 121 league games scoring six goals. He won the Player of the Season award twice while with the Foxes and would later describe his time with the club as probably the best three years as a footballer there.

On 24 February 1995, Thompson moved to Burnley for a £200,000 transfer fee where he made 49 league appearances, scoring one goal before leaving at the end of the 1996–97 season. On 1 August 1997, he signed for Rotherham United where he made 106 league appearances, and scored fourteen goals. In the 2000–01 season he joined Halifax Town where he spent one season, playing 36 games and scoring two goals. He then spent a season with Leigh RMI before retiring from football.

Coaching career

Blackpool
Thompson started coaching with the Centre of Excellence at Blackpool before becoming Head of the Youth Department in 2005. Following the appointment of Simon Grayson as Blackpool's manager Thompson was promoted to first team coach in 2006, and he coached the team in the 2006–07 season as the Seasiders were promoted to the Championship, making their first return to the second tier of English football for 29 years. In March 2008 he signed a new two-year extension to his contract at Bloomfield Road.
In December 2008 following the departure of the Seasiders manager Simon Grayson to Leeds United, Thompson became the assistant manager on a caretaker basis, with Tony Parkes as the caretaker manager. After Parkes' first game in charge, a 1–1 Boxing Day draw against Sheffield Wednesday at Hillsborough, Parkes revealed that the Blackpool board was willing to give him the job full-time, with Thompson as his assistant, if the team continue to perform as they did under Grayson. Speaking of his role as assistant manager at what he considers to be his hometown club, Thompson said, "I am enjoying the responsibility and myself and Tony have been bouncing ideas off each other. Tony will probably make the major decisions but I am enjoying it because it is the club that I love. I am a local lad and I am just as excited doing what I'm doing now as Simon Grayson probably is at Leeds." When Ian Holloway became Blackpool manager in summer 2009, Thompson stayed on as his assistant.

Three and a half years later, when Holloway left to become manager of Crystal Palace, Thompson was appointed caretaker manager before the match at Derby County on 3 November. It was Holloway who had picked the team, however. After the match, which Blackpool lost 4–1, Thompson stated his interest in applying for the job on a full-time basis. Blackpool won their next fixture, with Thompson still in charge, 2–0 at Sheffield Wednesday.

He resumed his caretaker role two months later when Michael Appleton left to become manager of Blackburn Rovers. He picked the team to face Charlton Athletic on 12 January, but they lost 2–1.

Huddersfield Town
On 6 June 2014, Thompson was hired as Mark Robins' new assistant manager at Huddersfield Town. He retained the position under new Huddersfield Manager Chris Powell.

Leeds United
On 18 December 2014, Thompson was hired as Neil Redfearn's new assistant at Leeds United. On 2 April 2015, Thompson was suspended by then Leeds director of football, Nicola Salerno for an 'internal matter'. Head Coach Neil Redfearn was kept in the dark as to why Thompson had been suspended.

On 24 June 2015, on the day Salerno left the club, Salerno gave an interview to Sky Sports, saying about Thompson: "I had a bad relationship with Steve but I didn't speak to Massimo about him."

Preston North End
On 1 July 2015, Thompson was appointed first-team coach of newly promoted Football League Championship side Preston North End, reuniting him with manager Simon Grayson 2013–2017. and Alex Neil 2017–2022

Oldham Athletic
On 9th November 2022, it was announced  that Thompson had been appointed as Head of Recruitment at his hometown club Oldham Athletic.

Personal life
His son, Curtis, signed as a first-year professional with Blackpool for the 2012–13 season.

Managerial statistics

Honours
Individual
PFA Team of the Year: 1989–90 Third Division

References

External links

1964 births
Living people
English footballers
Association football midfielders
Premier League players
Bolton Wanderers F.C. players
Luton Town F.C. players
Leicester City F.C. players
Burnley F.C. players
Rotherham United F.C. players
Halifax Town A.F.C. players
Leigh Genesis F.C. players
English football managers
Blackpool F.C. non-playing staff
Blackpool F.C. managers
Huddersfield Town A.F.C. non-playing staff
Leeds United F.C. non-playing staff
Preston North End F.C. non-playing staff